The Republic of Nauru Hospital (RON Hospital) is a hospital in Denigomodu District, Nauru.  The single hospital is the Republic of Nauru Hospital in Denigomodu District. It was formed by the amalgamation of the government-run Nauru General Hospital and the private Nauru Phosphate Corporation Hospital in 1999. It offers basic medical and surgical care, along with radiological, laboratory, pharmacy and dental services.

History
The hospital was established in 1999 after the merging of state-run Nauru General Hospital and private-run Nauru Phosphate Corporation Hospital.

Facilities
The hospital consists of health facilities for radiology, lab works and surgery.

See also
 Health in Nauru

References

1999 establishments in Nauru
Hospitals established in 1999
Hospitals in Oceania
Buildings and structures in Nauru